Prostanthera striatiflora, commonly known as jockey's cap, striated mintbush or striped mintbush,
 is a species of flowering plant that is endemic to the more arid areas of Australia. It is an erect, aromatic shrub with narrow egg-shaped to narrow elliptic leaves and white flowers with purple lines inside the petal tube.

Description
Flowering occurs from July to November.

Taxonomy
Prostanthera striatiflora was first formally described in 1853 by Ferdinand von Mueller in Linnaea: ein Journal für die Botanik in ihrem ganzen Umfange, oder Beiträge zur Pflanzenkunde based on plant specimens that he collected  during his 1851 expedition through the Flinders Ranges in South Australia.

Distribution and habitat
Jockey's cap occurs in arid areas of New South Wales, Queensland, Western Australia, South Australia and the Northern Territory where it grows in woodland in rocky, dry terrain.

Use in horticulture
The species is cultivated for its showy flowers and aromatic foliage. It prefers a well-drained situation in full sun or partial shade and tolerates both dryness and frost. It is suited to cultivation in large containers.

References

striatiflora
Flora of New South Wales
Flora of Queensland
Flora of South Australia
Flora of Western Australia
Flora of the Northern Territory
Lamiales of Australia
Plants described in 1853
Taxa named by Ferdinand von Mueller